Usman Ghani (born 20 November 1996) is an Afghanistan international cricketer  He is a right-handed opening batsman.

Career
He made his debut in 2014 Asian Cricket Council Premier League against HongKong at Bayuemas Oval, Kuala Lumpur on May 1, 2014 in which he took a wicket gave 21 runs then while batting he scored 70 runs off 68 with 6 fours and 4 sixes. 
Then next ODI he scored 55 runs against UAE. He was leading run scorer in the tournament with 228 runs at an average of 45.60.

On Zimbabwe Tour, he scored 79 runs with six fours and three sixes and help Afghanistan edge past Zimbabwe A by 16 runs in tour match at Bulawayo Athletic Club.

In the second ODI, Ghani was one man show up Afghanistan's innings against Zimbabwe at Queens Sports Club. Ghani scored 118 off 143 deliveries which is the jointly equal for the highest score by an Afghanistan batsman and the highest individual score was Gulbadin Naib's 23 but Sikandar Raza Butt's 141 helped Zimbabwe crush Afghanistan by eight wickets and took 2–0 lead in the four-match series.

He made his Twenty20 International debut for Afghanistan against Zimbabwe on 26 October 2015.

He made his first-class debut for Band-e-Amir Region in the 2017–18 Ahmad Shah Abdali 4-day Tournament on 19 November 2017.

In July 2018, he was the leading run-scorer for Band-e-Amir Region in the 2018 Ghazi Amanullah Khan Regional One Day Tournament, with 218 runs in five matches.

In September 2018, he was named in Balkh's squad in the first edition of the Afghanistan Premier League tournament. and his first-wicket partnership with Hazaratullah Zazai was also a record for any wicket in a T20I, with 236 runs scored. In September 2020, he was the leading run-scorer in the 2020 Shpageeza Cricket League, with 355 runs in seven matches.

In September 2021, he was named in Afghanistan's squad for the 2021 ICC Men's T20 World Cup.

References

External links
 

1996 births
Living people
Afghan cricketers
Pashtun people
Afghanistan One Day International cricketers
Afghanistan Twenty20 International cricketers
Cricketers at the 2015 Cricket World Cup
Spin Ghar Tigers cricketers
Band-e-Amir Dragons cricketers
Balkh Legends cricketers